Mario Pezzi (9 November 1898 – 26 August 1968) was an Italian aviator known worldwide for his flight in which he achieved greater height than any other pilot in a propeller-powered airplane.

Biography 

The future lieutenant general was born on 9 November 1898. He had one brother, Enrico, who also grew up to be a General in the Italian Air Force.  Mario joined the Infantry in October 1917, and the next year earned the rank of second lieutenant.  He received his pilot's license in 1926.  The next year he became part of the General Staff, rising to Cabinet of the Defense Ministry in 1931.

After Pezzi's record flight, he was decorated with the Gold Medal of Aeronautic Valor and promoted Colonel.  Later he also became Commander of Aeronautics as well as Chief of the General Staff. From 1950-1955, Pezzi worked as Head of Cabinet of the Minister and, subsequently, General Secretary of Aeronautics.

Pezzi is rightly considered an aeronautics and astronautics pioneer in Italy not only for his altitude records: he was the man who chose Luigi Broglio to lead the ITAF Ammunition Research Unit, responsible for rockets and missiles research, leading the way to future space exploration in Italy. Broglio himself described that meeting with Pezzi: "In 1956, secretary-general of ITAF Pezzi, the man famous for his altitude flight records, asked me to replace the officer responsible for the ITAF Ammunition Research Unit, a branch of the Service dealing with rockets and missiles too. I answered that it was not my field, my field being airplanes, not rockets. Pezzi objected: "Then give me the name of some top brass who is expert in that field". I answered again no, I did not know anyone with such a capability. "Well, then the job is yours" was Pezzi's conclusion.

Record Flight 

Pezzi established his record above Montecelio (Rome) aboard a Caproni Ca.161 biplane with a Piaggio motor and pressurised airtight cabin, wearing a special pressure suit picture and reaching a height of 17,083 m (56,047 ft).  This record still stands today.

On 7 May 1937 Pezzi took off from the Guidonia-Montecelio base in a Caproni Ca161 aircraft powered by a 14 cyl. double stellar engine supercharged by a double centrifugal 750 hp compressor. Piloting this aircraft he climbed to 15,655 m (51,362 ft). Pezzi wore a special electrically heated pressurized suit and an airtight helmet, just like a modern astronaut. In the Caproni hangars in the meantime work went on ceaselessly to produce a new version of the aircraft, the Ca161bis designed by engineer Verduzio. Its cockpit was embedded in an air-tight shell, the first one to be built in the history of flight. The great expectations on this machine were soon fulfilled: on 22 October 1938 Pezzi attained a new world record for altitude in a propeller-driven, piston-engined aircraft (17,083 m, 56,047 ft), a record still unbeaten today.

In those years Americans, Germans, English and French fought for this record, and Italy entered the contest with 14,433 m (47,355 ft) in 1934 from Donates on his Caproni Ca.113 with a Pegaso motor.

In 1936, the Englishman Francis Ronald Swain achieved 15,230 m (49,970 ft) with a Bristol 138; but in the same year Pezzi surpassed this, reaching 15,635 m (51,300 ft) aboard a Ca.161.

In 1937, the Englishman M.J. Adam in his turn exceeded it with 16,440 m (53,940 ft) to edge ahead once again in the Bristol 138.

On 22 October the following year, Pezzi achieved his still-valid world record for propeller aircraft with a height of 17,083 m (56,046.6 feet).

As a young man, Pezzi had entered a career in aeronautics, becoming a pilot, and in 1934 he had been named commander of the unit for the record flight from Montecelio. He became a high official and received many decorations. In the post-war period he was general secretary of Aeronautics and subsequently head of Cabinet of the Defense Ministry.

References 
Enrico Pezzi's Family Website

Italian aviators
1898 births
1968 deaths
Caproni people
Flight altitude record holders
Recipients of the Medal of Aeronautic Valor
Italian aviation record holders